U.S. school districts:
 Malvern Community School District, a former school district headquartered in Malvern, Iowa
 Martin County School District, a Florida school district headquartered in Stuart
 Marshalltown Community School District, an Iowa school district headquartered in Marshalltown
 Merced City School District, a California school district headquartered in Merced
 Muscatine Community School District, an Iowa school district headquartered in Muscatine
 Muscogee County School District, the county government agency which operates the public schools of Muscogee County, Georgia
 Monticello Central School District, a New York school district headquartered in Monticello
 Murray City School District, a Utah school district headquartered in Murray

Other:
 Mathematical and Computational Sciences Division 
 Member of the Chartered Society of Designers, a professional body for designers
 Microsoft Certified Solutions Developer, a retired component of the Microsoft Certified Professional Program